Lawrence Thomas Persico (born November 21, 1950) is an American prelate of the Roman Catholic Church. He has been the bishop of the Diocese of Erie in Pennsylvania since 2012.

Biography

Early life 
Lawrence Persico was born on November 21, 1950, in Monessen, Pennsylvania.  He attended St. Cajetan Elementary School.  In 1969, he graduated from St. Joseph Hall Minor Seminary in Greensburg, Pennsylvania.  He received his bachelor's degree from the St. Pius X Seminary in Erlanger, Kentucky.  Persico earned his Master of Divinity degree from Saint Vincent Seminary in Latrobe, Pennsylvania.

Priesthood 
Persico was ordained a priest by Bishop William G. Connare for the Diocese of Greensburg on April 30, 1977. Persico served as parochial vicar of Immaculate Conception Parish in Irwin, Pennsylvania from 1977 to 1980.  In 1982, he received a Licentiate of Canon Law from the Catholic University of America in Washington, D.C. On his return to Greensburg, Bishop Connare appointed Persico as assistant chancellor of Assumption Hall, where he served from 1983 to 1984. Persico then served as vice-chancellor of the diocese from 1984 to 1989, and chancellor beginning in 1989.  During this time, he also served as chaplain to the Sisters of Charity community in Greensburg.

In 1998, Persico was appointed pastor of Saint James Parish in New Alexandria, Pennsylvania, where he served until being named bishop in 2012. He was also moderator of the curia, and as the bishop's delegate for clergy sexual abuse.  In 2005, Bishop Lawrence Brandt named Persico vicar general of the diocese.  From 2006 to 2011, he served two terms as vice-president of the Pennsylvania Catholic Conference. He was named by the Vatican as a monsignor in either 2005 or 2008.

Bishop of Erie 
On July 31, 2012, Pope Benedict XVI appointed Persico as bishop of the Diocese of Erie, Pennsylvania.  He was consecrated by Archbishop Charles J. Chaput on October 1, 2012 at the diocese's St. Peter Cathedral.

Response to sex abuse cases 

In early 2016, a grand jury investigation, led by Pennsylvania Attorney General Josh Shapiro, began an inquiry into sexual abuse by Catholic clergy in six Pennsylvania dioceses, including the Diocese of Greenburg.  The grand jury report was published on August 14, 2018.

When speaking about Persico's handling of the case of Rev. David Poulson, a perpetrator of sexual abuse, "Shapiro said the diocese knew since at least May 2010 of Poulson’s sexual predator tendencies – but did nothing to report him to authorities until September 2016, in response to a subpoena from the grand jury." Persico was installed as bishop of the Erie Diocese in 2012, which points to the fact that it took him four years to deem the allegations against Poulson to be credible. (Persico claims that "Poulson's name was not raised" during this four year span).  Jim VanSickle, one of Poulson's accusers, said in an interview: “I do believe Bishop (Donald) Trautman and Bishop (Lawrence) Persico (of the Erie Diocese) knew." “Father Poulson came forward in 2010 and said he becomes aroused around adolescent boys and he had a problem,” said VanSickle in the same interview. This detail was in fact kept on record within the Bishop's archives ever since 2010. Although Persico's response to abuse cases has been largely praised by the local press, Persico's negligence in the Diocese of Greensburg is well cataloged in the official Grand Jury Report: Page 510 of the report reads: "On April 12, 2002, a phone call was received by Father Lawrence Persico from a witness ("Witness #1"), the contents of which were provided to Statnick. Witness #1 claimed that Sredzinski abused a relative of hers in Brownsville, PA in 1985 and that Sredzinski should be looked into further. There was nothing otherwise noted in the file regarding this phone call, including whether there was any follow-up by the Diocese."

Page 509 of Grand Jury Report reads: "According to notes in Sredzinski's Diocesan file, on April 9, 2007, the mother of a classmates of Victim #1 placed a telephone call to Persico and informed him that her son had told her that when he was in 7th or 8th grade, Sredzinski abused Victim #1. It was her understanding that Victim #1's parents tried to report the incident to Statnick when Victim #1 was in 7th or 8th grade, but that nothing was ever done about it. She also indicated that Sredzinski took Victim #1 and her son overnight to Seven Springs when they were young. Persico's response was that because Victim #1 was 28 years old at the time of the mother's call, Victim #1 needed to report any abuse by Sredzinski himself."

In 2017 Persico settled a lawsuit outside of court regarding the complaints a former diocesan employee, after Rev. Daniel Kresinski repeatedly made unwanted advances upon her using obscene sexual gestures. The former employee claims she was forced to resign in October 2013 because the diocese failed to “address or remedy” what she claims was the sexually hostile work environment, according to the lawsuit. Persico initially told her that "he did not want her to contact the press with her complaint and asked her to sign a nondisclosure agreement," which she initially declined to sign. Before the victim finally agreed to a private monetary settlement, Persico's lawyer unsuccessfully requested the Court to throw out the case on the grounds that it “would require the Court to engage in an impermissible evaluation of the church’s internal governance in violation of the First Amendment."

Persico was one of the few prelates to be praised in the grand jury report detailing clerical sexual abuse in six Pennsylvania dioceses, for his cooperation with the grand jury investigation.  Shapiro stated, "Bishop Persico’s response to this crisis gives me hope.  He was the only (bishop) to testify to the grand jury. He wanted to do the right thing. He did."

In April 2018, only three months prior to the release of the findings of the grand jury report to the general public, the Diocese of Erie published a list of 34 priests and 17 laypeople who had been "credibly accused" of sexually abusing children.  By July, the list had grown to include 64 names.

As of January 2020, Trautman keeps an office at the Catholic Diocese of Erie’s main building on East Grandview Boulevard in Erie, despite the fact that Persico acknowledged there had been a cover-up in the church. As of May 2019 he has yet to clarify pages 509-510 of the Grand Jury report which make it evident that he [Persico] failed to report an abuse case to civil authorities while he worked under the Greensburg Diocese. Also, Persico has not explained why it took him four years to review the file of abuse allegations involving Rev. David Poulson within the Erie Diocese. After the Grand Jury report was released, Persico stated that he felt that the grand jury report should have included the names of accused laypeople who worked for the Erie Diocese as well.

James Faluszczak claims that he attempted to report an abuse case to the Erie Diocese twice regarding Rev. Daniel J. Martin — "first to Bishop Donald Trautman in 2010, and then to his successor, Bishop Lawrence Persico." Faluszczak says he had "several conversations with Persico from October 2013 to February 2016, in which he also presented allegations on behalf of other victims." Faluszczak says that Persico "totally ignored" his claims. "He certainly treated me as if it was nothing. He didn't take it seriously," complains Faluszczak. "When I told him that Father Martin molested me 15 times, he couldn't even bring himself to say that he was sorry that that happened to me."

See also 

 Catholic Church hierarchy
 Catholic Church in the United States
 Historical list of the Catholic bishops of the United States
 List of Catholic bishops of the United States
 Lists of patriarchs, archbishops, and bishops

References

External links 
 Roman Catholic Diocese of Erie Official Site
 Curriculum Vitae 

1950 births
Roman Catholic bishops of Erie
Living people
People from Monessen, Pennsylvania
Saint Vincent Seminary alumni
21st-century Roman Catholic bishops in the United States